Nadir Awadh Mabrook (born 5 December 1994), is an Omani footballer who plays for Al-Nasr and Oman national team.

References

External links
 

1994 births
Living people
Omani footballers
Oman international footballers
Omani expatriate footballers
Association football defenders
Dhofar Club players
Al-Nasr SC (Salalah) players
Qatar Stars League players
Qatari Second Division players
Al-Shahania SC players
Oman Professional League players
Expatriate footballers in Qatar
Omani expatriate sportspeople in Qatar
People from Salalah